Demetrius Triclinius (b. ca. 1300), a native of Thessalonica, was a Byzantine scholar who edited and analyzed the metrical structure of many texts from ancient Greece, particularly those of Aeschylus, Sophocles and Euripides. He is often compared favorably with two contemporary annotators of ancient Greek texts, Thomas Magister and Manuel Moschopulus. He also had knowledge of astronomy.

References

Bibliography

See also
Palaeologan Renaissance
Byzantine scholars in Renaissance
List of Macedonians (Greek)

Byzantine grammarians
Byzantine Thessalonian writers
14th-century Byzantine writers